StarTomorrow was an online-only musical talent search created by NBC and music executive Tommy Mottola produced by 25/7 Productions in association with CenterStaging and Rehearsals.Com.

History
NBC announced that it would air StarTomorrow in February 2006. Mottola severed his relationship with the show in June 2006, and producer David Foster was brought in. The prize was subsequently changed from a recording contract with Mottola's Casablanca Records to a contract with Foster's label.

Hosted by Michele Merkin, StarTomorrow premiered on NBC and NBC.com on July 31, 2006, when a one-hour show about the auditions aired on NBC.  In a format similar to American idol, 92 bands competed in weekly head-to-head competition, and bands that won were then given the chance to compete in the competition's second round.

The show finale was in November 2006 and was eventually won by award-winning artist, Cindy Alexander. However, the show's contract was so bad that none of the Top 5 (Cindy Alexander, Bob Gentry, Brooke Ramel, Hydra FX, Blake Cody) bands signed.  NBC officially ceased production on March 26, 2007.

Judges
Travis Barker
Mick Fleetwood
David Foster
Billy Gibbons
Rob Tannenbaum

Partial list of contestants

Round One

Week one winners
Aruna
Red Letter
Tim Corley
Far From Nowhere
Marissa Ponticorvo
Next Phase
Jeff Coffey
UNIQ
Big Toe
Mili Mili
Tubby

Week two winners

Stella's Notch
Mike Corrad
Cedric Thomas
Tubby
Blake Cody
Sharif
Bob Gentry
Another Found Self
This is Danica
Broken Pony
Men in Black
Shaley Scott

Week three winners
Tony B
Blake Cody
d Henry Fenton
Nikko
Scarlet Crush
The Blue Sky Traffic
Melodee Lynn Holsinger
Tubby
Kings of Spain
The Dre Allen Project
HydraFX

Week four winners
Malia Star
Jonalee White
Blake Cody
David Reavis and Kenny Kallam
Loose Chains
Slapdash Graduate
Dig Jelly
Pete Hopkins
Tubby
Tasha Taylor and the Band

Week five winners
Warren Beaumont
Michelle Andria
The Sexies
Rob Perez
Cindy Alexander
Tubby
Brooke Ramel
Horny Toad
Aria Johnson

Week six winners
Big Toe
Jonalee White
Slapdash Graduate
Pete Hopkins
Tony B
Red Letter
Tubby
The Blue Sky Traffic
Marissa Ponticorvo

Other weeks 
Sheila E.
Mick Jones

References

External links
StarTomorrow
StarTomorrow Afterparty Hosts performances by eliminated contestants.
Star Tomorrow Mania

American music television series
American non-fiction web series